Afeda is a genus of moth in the family Cosmopterigidae. It consists of only one species, Afeda biloba, which is found in Florida.

References

External links

Natural History Museum Lepidoptera genus database

Chrysopeleiinae
Monotypic moth genera
Moths of North America